Klara Sierońska-Kostrzewa (28 July 1913 – 20 July 1990) was a Polish gymnast. She competed in the women's artistic team all-around event at the 1936 Summer Olympics.

References

1913 births
1990 deaths
Polish female artistic gymnasts
Olympic gymnasts of Poland
Gymnasts at the 1936 Summer Olympics
Sportspeople from Chorzów